The premiership of Mohammad Mosaddegh began when his first government was formed on 28 April 1951 and ended on 19 August 1953, when his second government was overthrown by the American–British backed coup d'état. During the time, the two cabinets of Mosaddegh took control except for a brief period between 16 and 21 July 1952, in which Ahmad Qavam was the Prime Minister, taking office due to resignation of Mosaddegh from premiership and deposed by Shah after five days of mass demonstrations.

First cabinet

Second cabinet

See also 
 The nationalization of the Iran oil industry movement

References

External links

1951 establishments in Iran
1952 establishments in Iran
1952 disestablishments in Iran
1953 disestablishments in Iran
Cabinets established in 1951
Cabinets disestablished in 1952
Cabinets established in 1952
Cabinets disestablished in 1953
Cabinets of Iran
Cold War history of Iran
Mohammad Mosaddegh
Nationalism in Iran
National Front (Iran)
Pahlavi Iran